The title of New Martyr or Neomartyr (-, neo-, the prefix for "new"; and μάρτυς, martys, "witness") is conferred in some denominations of Christianity to distinguish more recent martyrs and confessors from the old martyrs of the persecution in the Roman Empire. Originally and typically, it refers to victims of Islamic persecution.

The earliest source to use the term neomartys is the Narrationes of Anastasius of Sinai, who died around 700. The title continued to be used for the next three hundred years to refer to victims of Umayyad and Abbasid persecution. It was mainly used in Greek sources, but is occasionally found in Arabic, Georgian and Syriac sources. Between the 11th and 14th centuries, the Byzantine–Seljuq wars also generated a number of neomartyrs.

The Greek Orthodox Church traditionally gives the title to those who had been tortured and executed during Ottoman rule in Greece in order to avoid forced conversion to Islam. This meaning is the dominant one, so much so that pre-Ottoman use of the term has been almost ignored in academia. Sectarian conflicts of the 19th century within the Ottoman Empire and Communist persecution in eastern Europe also generated saints considered neomartyrs.

List of new martyrs

Under Umayyad rule
Euphemia of Damascus (before 700)
Sixty Martyrs of Jerusalem (725)

Under Abbasid rule
Elias of Heliopolis (779)
Romanus (780)
Theophilus the New (780s)
Abo of Tbilisi (786)
Bacchus-Ḍaḥḥāk (786/7)
George-Muzāḥim (978)

Under Turkish rule 

The first new martyrs were recorded after the Seljuk invasion of Asia Minor (11th century). In the Eastern Orthodox Church, the third Sunday after Pentecost is known as the "Commemoration of All New Martyrs of the Turkish Yoke."

Ahmed the Calligrapher or Ahmed Kalfas)
Akylina of Chalkidike
Anthimos the Georgian
Aquilina of Thessalonica
Athanasios the Neomartyr
Boris the Pomak
Chrestos the Albanian
Chrysostomos of Smyrna
Constantin Brâncoveanu
Constantine Hagarit
Cosmas of Aetolia
Cyril VI of Constantinople, ethnomartyr
Demetrios Doukas
Demetrios of Philadelphia
Demetrios the Neomartyr
Ephraim the Neomartyr
Gabriel I of Pec
Patriarch Gabriel II of Constantinople
George of Ioannina
George the New
George of Kratovo (d. 1515)
Gregory V of Constantinople
Hasan
John Calphas ("the Apprentice")
John of Ioannina, a.k.a. John the Tailor
John the New of Suceava
Archbishop Kyprianos of Cyprus
Makarios the Monk
Michael Mavroudis
Niketas the Young
Paisius and Habakkuk
Panteleimon Dousa
Paul of Constantinople, 6/19 April 1683
Paul the Russian
Philothei
Theocharis of Nevşehir (Neapoli)
Teodor of Vršac
Theodore Gabras
Theodore of Komogovina
Thomas Paschidis
Zlata of Meglen

Under Communist rule 

In the Russian Orthodox Church, the Sunday closest to 25 January (7 February on the Gregorian Calendar) is the "Sunday of the Holy New Martyrs and Confessors of Russia." The date of 25 January was chosen because that was the date in 1918 of the martyrdom of St. Vladimir (Bogoiavlensikii), Metropolitan of Kiev, who is referred to as the "Protomartyr of the communist yoke in Russia."

 Alexander Hotovitzky
 Anastasia Hendrikova
 Andronic Nikolsky
 Bishop Arcadius Ostalsky,
 Bishop Arseny Zhadanovsky, who was the last abbot of the Chudov Monastery which was also destroyed
 Bishop Basil (Preobrashensky) of Kineshma
 Archbishop Dimitry (Dobroserdov)
 Grand Duchess Elizabeth Fyodorovna and Nun Barbara
 Dr. Eugene Botkin (see Romanov sainthood)
 Bishop Hermogenes (Dolganyov)
 Metropolitan Benjamin of Petrograd
 John Kochurov of Tsarskoye Selo (First martyr of the Revolution)
 Archpriest John Vostorgov
 Metropolitan Joseph, 1938
 Archimandrite Kronid Lubimov
 Archpriest Makary Kvitkin
 Margarete of Menzelinsk
 Maria of Gatchina, c. 1930
 Bishop Maxim of Serpukhov 23 June/6 July 1931
 Nicholas II of Russia with his immediate family and servants (see Romanov sainthood)
 Fr. Nicholas Zagorovsky, 1943 (confessor)
 Bishop Nikita Dilektorsky
 Nikodim of Solovki
 Archbishop Nikolay Dobronravov
 Metropolitan Peter of Krutitsy
 Metropolitan Seraphim Chichagov of St. Petersburg
 Patriarch Tikhon, 1925 (confessor)
 Vladimir Beneshevich
 Metropolitan Vladimir (Bogoyavlensky) First hierarch martyred by the Bolsheviks.
 Bishop Platon (Kulbusch)

Under Nazism
 Alexander Schmorell, member of the White Rose Resistance group
 Bishop Gorazd of Prague
 Archimandrite Grigol Peradze
 Maria Skobtsova of Paris and Ravensbrück, nun

Serbia 

 Đorđe Bogić
 Gorazd Pavlik
 Joanikije Lipovac
 Saint Prince Lazar
 Petar Zimonjić
 Platon Jovanović
 Rafailo of Šišatovac
 Sava Trlajić
 Vukašin Mandrapa

Boxer Rebellion 
 is celebrated as the feast of the "New Martyrs of China Slain During the Boxer Rebellion"
Ia the Teacher
Holy Martyrs of China

Austria-Hungary
Hieromartyr Maximus Sandovic, 24August/6 September 1914

Post-Soviet Russia
 Daniel Sysoyev Muscovite priest and missionary assassinated by an Islamist militant
 Yevgeny Rodionov, a Russian soldier who fought in First Chechen War, was taken prisoner, tortured and eventually murdered for his refusal to convert to Islam

 the Russian Orthodox Church has not glorified either of the martyrs listed above, but each has received widespread popular veneration.

See also
Aftermath of World War II 
Hieromartyr

References

Further reading 
Blackwell Dictionary of Eastern Christianity, 341-43
Sahner, Christian C. Christian Martyrs under Islam Religious Violence and the Making of the Muslim World. Princeton University Press, 2018.
Vaporis, Rev. Nomikos Michael.  Witnesses for Christ: Orthodox Christian Neomartyrs of the Ottoman Period 1437-1860

External links
Calendar of Orthodox Church England contains NeoMartyrs
Christian Greek orthodox Neomartyrs: A Case Study
Russian New Martyrs and Confessors
Neo-Martyrs of the Soviet regime 
Pravoslavie's Article on Neo-Martyr
The shrine to the Great Purge

Eastern Orthodox martyrs of the Late Modern era
Canonised servants of the Romanov household
20th-century Eastern Orthodox martyrs
Types of saints